Cording may refer to:

Cording (dog grooming)
Cording (mycobacterium)
Cording (surname), a surname

See also
Cord (disambiguation)